Ruraldale is an unincorporated community in Muskingum County, in the U.S. state of Ohio.

History
Ruraldale was originally called Rockville, but the name was changed to Ruraldale when the town site was platted in 1854. A post office called Rural Dale was established in 1852, the name was changed to Ruraldale in 1895, and the post office closed in 1902.

Notable person
Farmer Vaughn, a catcher for the Cincinnati Reds, was born at Ruraldale in 1864.

References

Unincorporated communities in Muskingum County, Ohio
1854 establishments in Ohio
Populated places established in 1854
Unincorporated communities in Ohio